Cyperus fastigiatus is a species of sedge that is native to parts of South Africa.

The species was first formally described by the botanist Christen Friis Rottbøll in 1773.

See also 
 List of Cyperus species

References 

fastigiatus
Taxa named by Christen Friis Rottbøll
Plants described in 1773
Flora of South Africa